Lavigerie may refer to:

 Charles Lavigerie, a French cardinal, archbishop of Carthage and Algiers and primate of Africa
 Lavigerie, a commune of the Cantal département, in France